Sessions House (also called the "Tuscan House") is a historic Italianate style house at 157 Mentor Avenue in Painesville, Ohio.

Constructed in Italianate style in 1873 for the widow of one of the region's pioneers, the building was added to the National Register of Historic Places in 1973.

References

Houses on the National Register of Historic Places in Ohio
Italianate architecture in Ohio
Houses completed in 1870
Houses in Lake County, Ohio
National Register of Historic Places in Lake County, Ohio